Keyserlingitinae is a subfamily of the Sibiritidae, Early Triassic Ammonoidea. Shells tend to have subquadrate whorl sections as in Durgaites and Kyserlingites  and to be  strongly ribbed or nodose or both.

Genera
The Keyserlingitinae includes 
Kyserlingites
Durgaites
Goricanites
Olenekoceras
Pseudokeyserlingites
Subolenekites

References
 W.J. Arkell, et al., 1957. Mesozoic Ammonoidea; Treatise on Invertebrate Paleontology, Part L. Geological Society of America and University of Kansas Press. 
 Keyserlingitinae, Paleodb 

Triassic ammonites
Ceratitoidea